Inay is a 1993 Filipino drama film directed by Artemio Marquez. The film stars Nora Aunor as the title role, along with Tirso Cruz III and Maridin Lumano. It was one of the entries in the 1993 Metro Manila Film Festival. This is the first film produced by couple Derek Dee, who is first introduced in this film, and Melanie Marquez under their film company Omni Films International.

Cast
 Nora Aunor as Sally
 Tirso Cruz III as Teddy
 Melanie Marquez as Gemma
 Chanda Romero as Prosecutor Attorney
 Tommy Abuel as Defense Attorney
 Jaclyn Jose as Anna
 Derek Dee as Angel Castro
 Maridin Lumano as Thea
 Carol Dauden as Catalina
 Orestes Ojeda as Donny
 Tita Muñoz as Mrs. Corcuera
 Caridad Sanchez as Aling Elena
 Louella de Cordova as Doctor de Cordova
 Nanding Fernandez as The Judge
 Tom Lupton as Leonardo
 Ces Aldaba as Policeman
 Renato Laurel as Policeman
 Jason Calma as Jason
 Ramir Lorenzo as Ramir
 Noel Allan as Publication Editor

Awards

References

External links

1993 films
1993 drama films
Filipino-language films
Philippine drama films